Akçaalan is a village in the Lapseki District of Çanakkale Province in Turkey. Its population is 30 (2021).

References

Villages in Lapseki District